Alloprosopaea is a genus of flies in the family Tachinidae.

Species
 Alloprosopaea algerica Mesnil, 1961
 Alloprosopaea efflatouni Villeneuve, 1923

References

Tachinidae
Taxa named by Joseph Villeneuve de Janti